Romanians in Germany are one of the sizable communities of the Romanian diaspora in Western Europe. According to German statistics from 2016, the number of Romanian nationals in Germany on 31 December 2015 was 452,718, which was up from 94,326 in 2008. By the end of 2019, the number had increased to 748,225.

History

Emigration to Germany from Romania was common throughout the 20th century, and continued steadily way into the early 21st century. Large numbers of ethnic Germans of Romania (most notably Transylvanian Saxons and Banat Swabians) left the country prior, during, and after the events that ultimately led to World War II.

In the times of the communist regime in Romania, albeit the borders were officially closed by authorities, significant  numbers of Romanian-Germans were allowed to emigrate to West Germany, particularly in the later years of the Ceaușescu era. This formed part of a series of ethnic migrations (including Jews to Israel and Hungarians to Hungary), which were tolerated under the then socialist rulership. During the 1980s, more than half of the people who left Romania went to Germany.

After the Romanian Revolution which took place in December of 1989, there has been a mass migration of Transylvania Saxons to Germany, approximately half a million of them immigrated to Germany.  

Emigration of ethnic Romanians to Germany become quite common in the 21st century, particularly after the entry of Romania in the European Union in 2007. The Romanian diaspora in Germany has a strong presence. If descent is actually taken into account as the main criterion of immigration, then the total number of individuals living in Germany who stem from Romania (both Romanian-German and Romanian) may amount to as much as 2,000,000 residents, therefore putting the Romanian diaspora living in this country the largest of all Romanian ones living within the European Union.

Notable people

Art
, painter
Adrian Ghenie, painter
Petre Hârtopeanu (1913–2001), painter
Diet Sayler, painter and sculptor
George Ștefănescu (1914–2007), painter

Entertainment
Ingrid Bisu, actress
Mircea Crișan (1924–2013), actor, comedian
Maria Drăguș, actress 
Marc Dumitru, actor and musician
Alexandra Maria Lara, actress 
, film producer
Florian Munteanu, actor, best known for his role as Viktor Drago in the drama film Creed II
Călin Netzer, film director 
, dancer and current judge for the reality television show Deutschland sucht den Superstar
Lupu Pick (1886–1931), film director, producer and screenwriter
, actress
, actress
, actor
Johanna Wokalek, actress

Music
, hip hop producer, member of the production duo Soulbrotha
, producer and rapper (Romanian mother)
, rapper, best known for his association with Kool Savas
Sergiu Celibidache (1912–1996), conductor and composer
Roger Cicero (1970–2016), jazz and pop musician
Michael Cretu, music producer, songwriter and founder of Enigma
Damae, singer, former vocalist of trance group Fragma (Romanian mother)
, hip hop producer
, singer and composer (Romanian mother)
Peter Herbolzheimer (1935–2010), jazz trombonist and composer
Nicolae Herlea (1927–2014), baritone 
, jazz saxophonist 
Ramona Nerra, singer and songwriter
Miss Platnum, singer and songwriter
Michael Radulescu, composer
, cellist
, singer and songwriter

Politics 

 Joana Cotar, member of the Alternative for Germany (AfD) party
 Markus Frohnmaier, member of the Alternative for Germany (AfD) party
 Ramona Pop, member of the Alliance '90/The Greens
 Octavian Ursu, member of the Christian Democratic Union

Sports
Karim Adeyemi, footballer (Romanian mother)
Michael Andrei, handballer
Alina Astafei, track and field athlete
Francis Bugri, footballer (Romanian mother)
, basketball coach, who discovered German NBA player Dennis Schröder
Călin Colesnic, former managing director of the Hispania Racing F1 Team 
Nicolae Firoiu, water polo coach
Ralph Gunesch, footballer
Andreas Ivan, footballer
Petre Ivănescu, handball coach
Simone Laudehr, football player (Romanian mother)
Mihai Leu, professional boxer
Elena Leonte, handball player
Stelian Moculescu, volleyball coach
Maximilian Nicu, footballer
Liviu-Dieter Nisipeanu, chess grandmaster
, handballer
Gerhard Poschner, footballer 
, professional boxer and IBF European Middleweight Champion 
Marcel Răducanu, footballer 
Albert Streit, footballer 
Romy Tarangul, judoka
Monica Theodorescu, equestrian 
Andreas Toba, artistic gymnast
Alexandra Wenk, swimmer (Romanian mother)
Luminita Zaituc, long-distance runner

Other
Cornel Chiriac (1941–1975), journalist, radio producer and jazz drummer
Ricarda Ciontoș, curator and production manager
, biophysicist
Eugen Coșeriu (1921–2002), linguist
Miriam Davoudvandi, journalist (Iranian Romanian)
Georg Maurer (1907–1971), poet
Paul Miron (1926–2008), linguist. The first professor of Romanian language and literature in West Germany
Vlad Mugur (1927–2001), theater director
Dan Petrescu (1953–2021), Romanian businessman and billionaire, one of the richest people in Romania at the time, stayed in West Germany for around a decade and had German citizenship
Ion N. Petrovici, neurologist
, writer
Nicolaus Sombart (1923–2008), sociologist
Catalin Voss, entrepreneur

See also  

Germany–Romania relations
Romanians in France
Romanian Australians
Romanian Americans
Romanian Canadians

References

European diaspora in Germany
Germany